Cindy Ledbetter is an American politician and nurse practitioner serving as a member of the Indiana House of Representatives from the 75th district. She assumed office on November 4, 2020.

Education 
Ledbetter earned an associate degree from Ivy Tech Community College of Indiana, followed by a Bachelor of Science in Nursing and Master of Science in Nursing from the University of Southern Indiana.

Career 
Ledbetter has worked as a nurse for 30 years, including at the Deaconess Midtown Hospital. She also served as a member of the Warrick County Council. Ledbetter was elected to the Indiana House of Representatives in November 2020.

References 

Living people
American nurses
People from Newburgh, Indiana
Indiana Republicans
University of Southern Indiana alumni
Year of birth missing (living people)